was the 7th daimyō of Obama Domain.

Biography
Tadamochi was the fifth son of Sakai Tadaoto by a concubine, and became daimyō in 1740 on the death of his elder brother Sakai Tadaakira. His courtesy title was Shuri-daiyu. His wife was a daughter of Matsudaira Sadanori of Takada Domain.

In 1741 Tadamochi was appointed a sōshaban and jisha-bugyō simultaneously, and later the same year, he became Osaka jōdai. In 1747 his courtesy title was changed to Sanuki-no-kami and his court rank was increased from Lower 5th, Junior grade to Lower 4th, Junior grade. From 1752-1756 he was appointed the 21st Kyoto Shoshidai, and he added the title of Jijū to his honorifics.

In 1754, the earliest recorded post-mortem examination in Japan was supervised by Tadamochi's personal physician. This investigation by Kosugi Genteki (1730–1791) was considered highly controversial by his contemporary peers.  The autopsy involved an examination of the corpse of an executed criminal somewhere within the precincts of Jidoin Temple north of Nijō Castle; and the results were eventually published in Zoshi (Description of the Organs) in 1759.

He retired from public office in 1757, and his title was changed to Sakyō-daifu. He died in 1775 without male heir

Tadamochi is buried with others of his clan at  Kuin-ji in Obama in what is today Fukui Prefecture.

References

Further reading
 Appert, Georges and H. Kinoshita. (1888).  Ancien Japon. Tokyo: Imprimerie Kokubunsha.
 Meyer, Eva-Maria. (1999).  Japans Kaiserhof in de Edo-Zeit: Unter besonderer Berücksichtigung der Jahre 1846 bis 1867. Münster: Tagenbuch. 
 Goodman, Grant Kohn. (2000).  Japan and the Dutch, 1600-1853. London: RoutledgeCurzon.   (cloth)
 Papinot, Jacques Edmund Joseph. (1906) Dictionnaire d'histoire et de géographie du japon. Tokyo: Librarie Sansaisha...Click link for digitized 1906 Nobiliaire du japon (2003)
 Plutschow, Herbert. (1995). [https://books.google.com/books?id=fNQjDQ-mWYgC&dq=sakai+tadayuki&lr=&source=gbs_summary_s&cad=0  "Japan's Name Culture: The Significance of Names in a Religious, Political and Social Context.] London: Routledge.  (cloth)
 Rosner, Erhard. (1989).  Medizingeschichte Japans. Leiden: Brill Publishers. 
 Sasaki Suguru. (2002). Boshin sensō: haisha no Meiji ishin.'' Tokyo: Chūōkōron-shinsha.

|-

Fudai daimyo
Sakai clan
Osaka jōdai
Kyoto Shoshidai
1725 births
1775 deaths